Mabel Cecilia Corby (25 October 1913 – 1 October 1993) was a New Zealand cricketer who played as a right-handed batter and right-arm medium bowler. She appeared in one Test match for New Zealand, their first, in 1935. She played domestic cricket for Wellington.

Born in Whanganui on 25 October 1913, Corby was the daughter of William Stewart Corby, who wrote for the Wanganui Herald newspaper for 40 years. She was educated at Gonville School, and became a primary school teaching specialising in physical education. As well as representing New Zealand in cricket, she was a field hockey player and trialled for the national team. She died on 1 October 1993, and was buried in Aramoho Cemetery, Whanganui.

References

External links
 
 

1913 births
1993 deaths
Cricketers from Whanganui
New Zealand women cricketers
New Zealand women Test cricketers
Wellington Blaze cricketers
New Zealand female field hockey players
Burials at Aramoho Cemetery